KAPY may refer to:

 KAPY-LP, a low-power radio station (104.9 FM) licensed to serve Duvall, Washington, United States
 KAPY-LP (defunct), a defunct low-power radio station (95.5 FM) formerly licensed to serve Port Angeles, Washington